Melanie Jayne Marshall  (born 12 January 1982) is a former British swimmer. She has won numerous medals for her country as well as being a swimming coach of the year for her work with Adam Peaty in Derby and later Loughborough.

Early life
She was born in Boston, Lincolnshire, brought up in the nearby village of Wrangle. She attended the Giles School in Old Leake.

Career
A long lasting international career started at the 1995 European Youth Olympics in Bath, where she won four gold medals.

Marshall was ranked number one in the world in 2004 after breaking the British 200 m freestyle record to ensure selection to the 2004 Olympic Games in Athens.

At the 2008 Short Course World Championships in Manchester, she came third as part of the British women's 4×100 m freestyle relay team.

Marshall claimed six medals at the 2006 Commonwealth Games in Melbourne, and is currently the second most decorated female athlete ever.  Marshall ended her swimming career at the 2008 Olympic Games in Beijing.

She is a three times winner of the ASA National British 100 metres freestyle title (2002, 2004 and 2005), the 400 metres freestyle champion in 2004 and 2005 and the 50 metres backstroke winner in 1998.

On 30 October 2008, Marshall announced her retirement from the sport. She was the head coach at City of Derby Swimming Club, where she first began coaching Commonwealth, European, World and Olympic champion Adam Peaty when he was twelve. In 2014 she was International swim coach of the year. Marshall has also worked as a coach with the British swimming team and has been named as an elite coach by UK Sport. In 2016 Marshall and Peaty both left City of Derby to join the Loughborough National Swimming centre. as lead coach.

Marshall was appointed Member of the Order of the British Empire (MBE) in the 2021 Birthday Honours for services to swimming and charity.

Personal life
She currently resides in Loughborough with her three dogs, Missy, Jetson and Rhonda, sadly Missy and Jetson no longer here. She is 1.7 m (5′ 7″), 62 kg.

See also
 List of World Aquatics Championships medalists in swimming (women)
 List of Commonwealth Games medallists in swimming (women)

References

External links
 British Swimming athlete profile
 British Olympic Association athlete profile
 2006 Melbourne Commonwealth Games athlete profile

1982 births
Alumni of Loughborough University
English female swimmers
Living people
Commonwealth Games bronze medallists for England
Commonwealth Games silver medallists for England
English swimming coaches
European Aquatics Championships medalists in swimming
British female freestyle swimmers
Medalists at the FINA World Swimming Championships (25 m)
Olympic swimmers of Great Britain
People from Boston, Lincolnshire
Sportspeople from Lincolnshire
Swimmers at the 2002 Commonwealth Games
Swimmers at the 2006 Commonwealth Games
Swimmers at the 2004 Summer Olympics
Swimmers at the 2008 Summer Olympics
World Aquatics Championships medalists in swimming
Commonwealth Games medallists in swimming
People from the Borough of Boston
Members of the Order of the British Empire
Medallists at the 2002 Commonwealth Games
Medallists at the 2006 Commonwealth Games